Reeds Branch is a stream in Vernon County, Missouri, in the United States. It is a tributary of the Little Osage River.

Reeds Branch was named for the family of Solomon Samuel Reed, pioneers who settled there in the 1840s.

See also
List of rivers of Missouri

References

Rivers of Vernon County, Missouri
Rivers of Missouri